Chicago Piano Solo is a live solo piano album by Irène Schweizer. It was recorded at The Empty Bottle in Chicago in August 2000, and was released in 2001 by Intakt Records.

Reception

In a review for AllMusic, Steve Loewy wrote: "Another strong effort from Irène Schweizer... By this stage in her career, the pianist is able to stamp her muscular, rhythmic style on a range of influences. You can hear touches of stride, swing, bop, and world jazz, all superimposed by Schweizer's freestyle postmodern interpretations. Whether she performs inside the body of the instrument... or simply plies a percussive repetitiveness... there are original, enlightening delights throughout... An important contribution to her already impressive discography, this recording should help to further cement Irène Schweizer's reputation as one of the most important piano improvisers of her time."

The authors of the Penguin Guide to Jazz Recordings awarded the album 4 stars, and stated: "The excellent sound... highlights the pianist's impeccable touch, the evenness of her attack in high-velocity sequences, and the absolute crispness (and decision) in the way she gets from one phrase to another... the logic of her playing is rare and seemingly invincible: there's nothing here which doesn't seem to fit or which stands as superfluous... another great one from the modest Swiss giant."

Track listing
Track 4 by Don Cherry. Remaining tracks by Irène Schweizer.

 "So Oder So" – 5:07
 "To The Bottle" – 4:22
 "Heilige Johanna (For B. B.)" – 9:16
 "Togetherness One (First Movement)" – 4:41
 "Stringfever" – 6:51
 "Circle" – 7:57
 "Hüben Ohne Drüben" – 2:57
 "Rag" – 5:27
 "Roots" – 3:56

Personnel 
 Irène Schweizer – piano

References

2001 live albums
Intakt Records live albums
Irène Schweizer live albums